Younite is a South Korean boy band formed by Brand New Music. The group currently consists of nine members: Eunho, Steve, Hyunseung, Eunsang, Hyungseok, Woono, Dey, Kyungmun, and Sion. The group made their official debut on April 20, 2022, with their first EP titled Youni-Birth.

Name
Younite means "YOU and I: we are connected".

History

Pre-debut
In 2019, Eunsang competed on the show Produce X 101 representing Brand New Music alongside Kim Si-hun, Yun Jung-hwan, and Hong Seong-jun, now of BDC. In the show's finale, he was made a member of the show's debut lineup in the 'X' position, making him a member of the group X1. He made his debut with the group on August 27, 2019, and amidst the Mnet voting manipulation scandal, the group ultimately disbanded on January 6, 2020.

On August 31, 2020, Eunsang made his solo debut with the single album Beautiful Scar. For the lead single, "Beautiful Scar", he collaborated with Park Woo-jin. In October, Eunsang collaborated with former X1 groupmate Kim Woo-seok for the single "Memories". On August 16, 2021, it was announced that Eunsang will be releasing his second single album Beautiful Sunshine and its lead single "Lemonade" on September 1.

In 2021, Kyungmun competed on the show Loud. Kyungmun represented JYP Entertainment alongside Lee Gye-hun and Amaru. He was eliminated in the fifth round.

2022–present: Debut with Youni-Birth and Youni-Q
On March 18, Brand New Music announced that Younite will make their debut with their first extended play (EP), Youni-Birth on April 20, 2022.

On July 25, Younite released their second extended play, Youni-Q.

On October 31st, the group released their third extended play, Youni-On. However, on October 30, the label announced the cancellation of the comeback showcase due to the national mourning period following the Itaewon Halloween crowd crush incident on the 29th.

Members
Adapted from their official website.

 Eunho (은호)
 Steve (스티브)
 Hyunseung (현승)
 Eunsang (은상)
 Hyungseok (형석)
 Woono (우노)
 Dey (데이)
 Kyungmun (경문)
 Sion (시온)

Discography

Extended plays

Singles

Awards and nominations

References

External links
  

2022 establishments in South Korea
Musical groups from Seoul
K-pop music groups
Musical groups established in 2022
South Korean dance music groups
South Korean boy bands
Brand New Music artists